Kontan is a business and financial regular publication in Indonesia published by PT Grahanusa Mediatama, owned by Kompas Gramedia. Kontan consists of two distinct publications: daily newspaper (as Kontan) and weekly tabloid-kind newspaper (as Tabloid Kontan), as well as an online portal.

Kontan was first published on 30 September 1996 as a weekly newspaper, covering Astra International ownership at its front page. The newspaper launched its own daily newspaper on 26 February 2007 as a "business and investment daily". Kontan launched its e-paper version a year later.

References

External links
 Official website

Business newspapers
1996 establishments in Indonesia
Newspapers published in Jakarta
Newspapers established in 1996
Indonesian-language newspapers
Kompas Gramedia Group